19 Leonis Minoris (19 LMi) is a spectroscopic binary located in the northern constellation Leo Minor. It has an apparent magnitude of 5.1, making it one of the brighter members of the constellation.

This spectroscopic binary can be classified as single lined because only the primary's spectrum can be observed clearly, with it having a stellar classification of F6 V. This makes it an ordinary F-type main-sequence star. The companion is probably a G-type main-sequence star of G0, having a mass 101% that of the Sun. The pair have a relatively circular orbit of about 9 days.

References

F-type main-sequence stars
G-type main-sequence stars
Spectroscopic binaries
Leo Minor
Leonis Minoris, 19
BD+41 02033
3574
086146
048833
3928